Baltisk may refer to:

Baltiysk, a town in Russia
Baltisk (crater), a crater on Mars